Kaveinga is a genus of wrinkled bark beetles in the family Carabidae.

Species
Kaveinga contains the following species:

References

Rhysodinae
Carabidae genera